"Chattahoochee" is a song co-written and recorded by American country music artist Alan Jackson. It was released in May 1993 as the third single from his album A Lot About Livin' (And a Little 'bout Love). The album is named for a line in the song itself. Jackson wrote the song with Jim McBride.

"Chattahoochee" also received CMA awards for Single of the Year and Song of the Year.

Background and writing
Alan Jackson talks about the song in the liner notes for his 1995 compilation album, The Greatest Hits Collection: "Jim McBride and I were trying to write an up-tempo song and Jim came in with the line 'way down yonder on the Chattahoochee'. It kind of went from there. It's a song about having fun, growing up, and coming of age in a small town - which really applies to anyone across the country, not just by the Chattahoochee. We never thought it would be as big as it's become."

Content
The song is uptempo and talks about growing up and falling in love along the Chattahoochee River that flows from northern Georgia and forms part of the borders that Georgia shares with Alabama and Florida.

Critical reception
Kevin John Coyne of Country Universe gave the song an A grade, saying that the song could have performed well because it "looked back on the innocence of adolescence with bemusement and fondness for that transitional period of life."

Music video
The music video was directed by Martin Kahan, premiered in May 1993, and uses the Extended Remix of the song. The video is remembered for Jackson water-skiing in his red cowboy boots and red life vest.

Chart performance
"Chattahoochee" debuted at #72 on the  U.S. Billboard Hot Country Singles & Tracks for the week of May 15, 1993. It also peaked at #46 on the Billboard Hot 100, becoming Jackson's first Hot 100 entry.

Year-end charts

References

1993 singles
1992 songs
Alan Jackson songs
Songs written by Alan Jackson
Songs written by Jim McBride (songwriter)
Billboard Hot Country Songs number-one singles of the year
Song recordings produced by Keith Stegall
Arista Nashville singles
Songs about rivers
Songs about Georgia (U.S. state)